The European Defence Fund (EDF) is a component of the European Union's (EU) Common Security and Defence Policy (CSDP) which aims to coordinate and increase national investment in defence research and improve interoperability between national armed forces. It was proposed in 2016 by Commission President Jean-Claude Juncker and established in 2017. The fund has two stands; Research (€90 million until the end of 2019 and €500 million per year after 2020) and Development & Acquisition (€500 million in total for 2019-20 then €1 billion per year after 2020). In July 2018, the European Commission announced that the EDF budget for 2021-2027 would be €13 billion. This sum was later revised by the European Commission as part of the new EU budget proposed on May 27th 2020, as a result of the COVID-19 pandemic, according to which the EDF will be allocated €8 billion over this budget period.

Aim
The European Commission co-finances joint defence industrial projects and supports collaborative defense research across the EU. Specifically, the Juncker Commission has planned and made an unprecedented effort to protect and defend Europeans. The plan is that from 2021, a fully-fledged European Defence Fund will foster an innovative and competitive defense industrial base and contribute to the EU's strategic autonomy. Strategic autonomy is the ability of the European Union to defend Europe and act militarily in its neighborhood without so much reliance on the United States. The goal of strategic autonomy is however not to act alone militarily, and the European Union can be characterized as non-interventionist in nature. The European Defence Fund, together with the Coordinated Annual Review on Defence and Permanent Structured Cooperation forms a new comprehensive defence package for the EU.

Eligible projects

Development of equipment and technology
Through two precursors to the Fund, the Commission took further steps to make defense cooperation a reality. In 2019 the Commission kick-started the first EU-funded joint defense related industrial projects through the European Defense Industrial Development Program. The first program agreed with the Member States provided €500 million in co-financing for the joint development of defense capabilities during 2019–2020. These cover priority areas in all domains such as air, land, sea, cyber and space:

 Protection and mobility of forces: to help develop CBRN threat detections capabilities or counter drone systems.
 Intelligence, secured communication & Cyber: situational awareness and defence, space situational awareness and early warning capabilities, or maritime surveillance capabilities.
 Operations: to upgrade or development of the next generation of ground-based precision strike capabilities, ground combat capabilities, air combat capabilities and future naval systems.
 Innovation & SMEs: to support solutions in Artificial Intelligence, Virtual Reality and Cyber technologies, as well as to support SMEs.
 Eurodrone: for a crucial capability for Europe's strategic autonomy.
 ESSOR to support interoperable and secure military communications.

Research
The 2019 Work Programme also dedicated €25 million for research in Electromagnetic Full-spectrum dominance and Future Disruptive Defence Technologies. These two areas have been identified as essential to maintain Europe's long-term lead and independence. The calls on Future Disruptive Defence Technologies will look at how best the EU can support disruptive technologies in defence that may lead to transformational changes in the military. This will help prepare the ground for the European Defence Fund which could allocate up to 8% of its budget for disruptive technologies. In June 2018, the Commission proposed to allocate €13 billion to the fund for the period 2021–2027. The aim is to support collaborative defence projects throughout the entire cycle of Research and development. The Council of the European Union and the European Parliament are to adopt the proposal by 2019.

See also
Organisation for Joint Armament Cooperation
European Defence Agency
European Research Council
Western European Armaments Group
Western European Armaments Organisation
NATO Support and Procurement Agency
NATO Standardization Office

References

External links
 European Defence Fund - factsheet
 EDIDP and PADR - factsheet
 More information on PADR Work Programme
 More information on EDIDP Work Programme
 The European Defence Fund: Questions and Answers, European Commission

Military equipment of the European Union
Military economics
Innovation economics

es:Fondo europeo de defensa